Arne Edvard Francke (6 May 1904 – 11 March 1973) was a Swedish horse rider. He competed in jumping at the 1932 and 1936 Summer Olympics, both times with the same horse Urfé, and in eventing at the 1932 Olympics. His best result was 25th place in individual jumping in 1936.

References

1904 births
1973 deaths
Olympic equestrians of Sweden
Swedish male equestrians
Equestrians at the 1932 Summer Olympics
Equestrians at the 1936 Summer Olympics
Sportspeople from Stockholm